Helge Zandén (23 July 1886 – 9 January 1972) was a Swedish painter. His work was part of the painting event in the art competition at the 1936 Summer Olympics.

References

1886 births
1972 deaths
20th-century Swedish painters
Swedish male painters
Olympic competitors in art competitions
People from Borås
20th-century Swedish male artists